is a railway station on the Hakodate Main Line in Otaru, Hokkaido, Japan, operated by Hokkaido Railway Company (JR Hokkaido). The station is numbered S17.

Lines

Station layout
The station has two side platforms connected by an overpass. Kitaca is not available. A Kan'i itaku agent staffs the ticket window and sells some types of tickets.

Platforms

Adjacent stations

History
By 28 June 1903, the track had been extended north from here to Otaru Chūō (now ). After the Hokkaido Railway was nationalized on 1 July 1907, Japanese Government Railways (JGR) took over control of the station. On 12 October 1909 the station became part of the Hakodate Main Line. On 1 April 1987, with the privatization of Japanese National Railways (JNR), the successor of JGR, the station came under the control of JR Hokkaido. From 1 October 2007, station numbering was introduced on JR Hokkaido lines, with Ranshima Station becoming "S17".

References

Railway stations in Otaru
Railway stations in Japan opened in 1902